Film censorship in the United Kingdom began with early cinema exhibition becoming subject to the Disorderly Houses Act 1751. The Cinematograph Act 1909 was primarily concerned with introducing annual licensing of premises where films were shown, particularly because of the fire risk of nitrate film. After the Act began to be used by local authorities to control what was shown, the film industry responded by establishing a British Board of Film Censors (BBFC) in 1912, funded by an Incorporated Association of Kinematograph Manufacturers levy.

The Cinematograph Exhibitors Association sought to have the BBFC film certification recognised over local decision-making. The case of Mills v London City Council in 1925 (1 KB 213) established that a Council could make its licensing conditional on the exhibitor complying with the BBFC certification. Local Councils did continue to refuse showing of particular films which had been certificated by the BBFC: examples are the bans on The Devils and Life of Brian in Glasgow.

Currently, Section 4 of the Video Recordings Act 1984 requires that videos for sale in the UK should be certified by an authority. The BBFC (by this time renamed as British Board of Film Classification) became that designated authority in 1985. The film censorship that exists in the UK today is in the form of an Age-Rating system, which is an advisory tool used by local councils when deciding to grant viewing permission to film productions.

List of banned films

Mull of Kintyre test

According to an urban legend, the Mull of Kintyre test or Mull of Kintyre rule was an unofficial guideline used by the British Board of Film Classification (BBFC) to decide whether an image of a penis could be shown. According to the myth, the BBFC would not permit the general release of a film or video if it depicted a penis erect to the point that the angle it made from the vertical was higher than that of the peninsula of Kintyre in Argyll and Bute on maps of Scotland. The BBFC has denied that any such "test" existed, and maintain it is merely a humorous rumour.

The Mull of Kintyre test was said to have first been used for the release of the controversial erotic historical drama film Caligula in 1979.

Specific cases
In Autumn 1972, Lord Longford and Raymond Blackburn decided to pursue a matter of pornography classification for the film Language of Love into the Court of Appeal of Lord Denning, MR, and lost the writ of mandamus against the Police Commissioner, who had refused to intrude upon the BBFC remit.
In 1999, the British television network ITV broadcast a censored version of the British war film The Dam Busters (1955), with all instances of the name of a dog called "Nigger" removed. ITV blamed regional broadcaster London Weekend Television, which in turn alleged that a junior staff member had been responsible for the unauthorised cuts. When ITV again showed a censored version in June 2001, it was criticised by Index on Censorship as "unnecessary and ridiculous" and because the edits introduced continuity errors. The code word "nigger" transmitted in Morse Code upon the successful completion of the central mission was not censored.
The film Black Friday (2004) was released in the United Kingdom with 17 seconds of the cockfighting scenes deleted. Laws in the UK do not allow any film footage of actual animal cruelty that has been deliberately orchestrated by film-makers.

See also

List of banned films
Cinema of the United Kingdom
Censorship in the United Kingdom
Video nasty
British Board of Film Classification (BBFC / Classification)
John Trevelyan (censor), former secretary (now called director) of the BBFC 1958-1971
James Ferman, former director of the BBFC 1975-1999
Robin Duval, former director of the BBFC 1999-2004

References

 

 Censorship United Kingdom